Why Me, Sweetie?! is a 2003 Hong Kong film directed by Jingle Ma and starring Louis Koo and Cherrie Ying.

Cast
 Louis Koo
 Cherrie Ying
 Tats Lau
 Sui Junbo

Plot
Movie that inspired the American "50 First Dates" With Adam Sandler.The movie starts with Don (Louis Koo) on a bus with 2 girls fighting over him. He then meets Ding Ding(Cherrie Ying) who suddenly falls in love with him. But when he woke up early next morning, he had forgotten Ding Ding and she got real mad at him. But luckily, a doctor(Tats Lau) told Ding Ding everything about Don. So they try to help Don with his memories, before he stays like that forever........

External links

Hong Kong romantic comedy films
2000s Cantonese-language films
2003 films
China Star Entertainment Group films
2000s Hong Kong films